One Bad Day may refer to:
 "One Bad Day" (Gotham), an episode of Gotham
 "One Bad Day" (The Punisher), an episode of The Punisher
 One Bad Day (novel), a graphic novel by Steve Rolston